Sarah Arnold (born February 11, 1990) is a Canadian ice dancer. She placed 8th at the 2018 Four Continents Championships with Thomas Williams and has also competed on the Grand Prix series, with Justin Trojek.

Personal life 
Arnold was born on February 11, 1990, in Etobicoke, Ontario. She has taught pilates and worked as a licensed massage therapist. She currently lives in Vancouver with her 100lbs Bernadoodle named Otis “Oatmeal”, aptly named after Otis Redding.

Skating career 
Arnold began learning to skate in 1993. Competing with Christopher Steeves in junior ice dancing, she placed 6th at the 2008 Canadian Championships and 5th at the 2009 Canadian Championships.

Arnold teamed up with Justin Trojek in 2009 and skated two seasons with him on the senior level. They competed on the Grand Prix series, placing 7th at the 2010 Skate Canada International, and finished 6th at the 2011 Canadian Championships. They were coached by Paul Macintosh  in Waterloo, Ontario.

Arnold and Thomas Williams had a tryout in February 2015. Although he decided to take a year off, they continued to skate together occasionally (around eight times) and began a formal partnership in March 2016. They placed 5th at the 2018 Canadian Championships and 8th at the 2018 Four Continents Championships. They are coached by Megan Wing and Aaron Lowe in Burnaby, British Columbia.

Programs

With Williams

With Trojek

With Steeves

Competitive highlights 
GP: Grand Prix; CS: Challenger Series

With Williams

With Trojek

With Steeves

References

External links 
 

1990 births
Canadian female ice dancers
Living people
Sportspeople from Etobicoke